Halleria may refer to:

 1308 Halleria, an asteroid
 Halleria (plant), a plant genus
 Halleria, a genus of mites, now treated as a synonym of Freyana